Otonyetarie Okoye is a Rivers State, Nigerea, lawyer and civil servant. She is currently the Permanent Secretary of the Rivers State Ministry of Agriculture. Okoye was sworn-in at Government House, Port Harcourt on 11 December 2013. Before that, she was the Rivers State Director of Public Prosecutions.

See also
Rivers State Civil Service
List of people from Rivers State

References

Living people
Rivers State lawyers
Rivers State civil servants
Year of birth missing (living people)